VERITAS (Venus Emissivity, Radio Science, InSAR, Topography, and Spectroscopy) is an upcoming mission from NASA's Jet Propulsion Laboratory (JPL) to map the surface of planet Venus in high resolution. The combination of topography, near-infrared spectroscopy, and radar image data will provide knowledge of Venus's tectonic and impact history, gravity, geochemistry, the timing and mechanisms of volcanic resurfacing, and the mantle processes responsible for them.

Proposal history 
VERITAS was one of dozens of proposals submitted in 2015 to potentially become the 13th mission of NASA’s Discovery Program. Suzanne Smrekar of NASA's Jet Propulsion Laboratory (JPL) would serve as the principal investigator, and JPL would be the managing agency. On 30 September 2015, VERITAS was selected as one of five finalists. On 4 January 2017, two other proposals to study small bodies, Lucy and Psyche, were selected as the 13th and 14th Discovery missions, respectively.

VERITAS was again proposed for the Discovery Program in 2019, and was selected for Phase A funding on 13 February 2020. On 2 June 2021, it was selected, along with DAVINCI+, to fly as one of the next Discovery missions. Each mission will get approximately US$500 million in funding. VERITAS was originally planned to be launched between the years 2028 and 2030. However, work on the mission was put on hold in November 2022, and the launch was delayed by at least three years (to no earlier than 2031), after an independent review of the Psyche mission found significant institutional issues at NASA and JPL.

Mission 

VERITAS will gather data to help scientists to answer three primary questions about Venus:
 How has its geology evolved over time?
 What geologic processes are currently operating on it?
 Has water been present on or near its surface?

Understanding Venus's geology is of significant scientific interest because of its similarities to Earth. Venus's size, age, and composition are all broadly similar to Earth's, but its environment is significantly different and less hospitable to life. Understanding Venus's geologic evolution therefore will help answer questions about the formation of planets hospitable to life. A key step in developing an understanding of this evolution is an investigation of Venus's current geology. Current data is highly suggestive of recent and active volcanism on Venus, but the extent of this volcanic activity is not completely known. Moreover, it is unknown to what degree surface water was historically present on Venus and what role subsurface water plays in Venus's modern geology. 

VERITAS will collect data to help answer these questions in several ways. High-resolution imagery will be obtained using an X-band radar configured as a single pass interferometric synthetic aperture radar (InSAR). This radar data will be coupled with a multispectral near-infrared (NIR) emissivity mapping capability. VERITAS will map surface topography with a spatial resolution of 250m and 5m vertical accuracy, and generate radar imagery with 30m spatial resolution. This high-resolution imaging data will allow scientists to locate active volcanic eruptions, to understand the age and composition of features on the planet's surface, and better understand the planet's overall geology. The spacecraft's communication system will also be used to perform a gravity science experiment to investigate variations in Venus' gravitational field. The spacecraft's telecom system will be used to map gravity strength at Venus' surface, providing a uniform resolution of better than 160 km. The data will provide an estimate of Venus' core size and information about topographic features that lie underneath the planet's surface.

Spacecraft 
VERITAS is designed to produce global, high-resolution topography and imaging of Venus' surface and produce the first maps of deformation and global surface composition, thermal emissivity, and gravity fields. Onboard the spacecraft will be two scientific instruments, the Venus Emissivity Mapper (VEM) and Venus Interferometric Synthetic Aperture Radar (VISAR).

 VEM (Venus Emissivity Mapper) is designed to map the surface emissivity using six spectral bands in five atmospheric windows that see through the clouds. It will be built by the German Aerospace Center (DLR). VEM also carries eight atmospheric bands for calibration and detection of near-surface water vapor.

 VISAR (Venus Interferometric Synthetic Aperture Radar) is designed to generate global data sets for topography (250 m horizontal by 5 m vertical accuracy) and SAR imaging at 30 m resolution with targeted resolution at 15 m. It will create the first planetary active surface deformation map (1.5 cm vertical).

In addition to these two instruments, the spacecraft will also carry the Deep Space Atomic Clock-2 as a secondary payload. The Deep Space Atomic Clock-2 is the successor to the Deep Space Atomic Clock payload flown on the STP-2 mission in June 2019, and is intended to provide highly precise timing for deep space missions.

See also 

 List of missions to Venus
 Magellan, the most recent previous NASA mission dedicated to Venus (1989-1993)
 DAVINCI+, a Venus atmospheric probe, selected alongside VERITAS for the Discovery program
 EnVision, an ESA mission to Venus in the same timeframe

References 

Discovery program proposals
Proposed space probes
Missions to Venus
2031 in science